.300 Remington Short Action Ultra Magnum (also known as 300 RSAUM, 300 RSUM or 300 Rem SAUM) is a .30 caliber short magnum cartridge that is a shortened version of the Remington 300 Ultra Mag, both of which derive from the .404 Jeffery case. The Remington Short Ultra Mag was put on the market shortly after Winchester released its 300 WSM round in 2001, resulting in the Winchester product getting the marketing advantage that has eclipsed the Remington offering.

Performance
The 300 RSAUM's ballistics are similar to 300 Win Mag and 300 WSM.  The difference in ballistics between the WSM and RSAUM are insignificant in all practical applications. Differences in muzzle velocity and muzzle energy are related to barrel length rather than case dimension.

Muzzle velocity
 10.69 g (165 gr) full metal jacket (FMJ): 3,075 ft/s
 11.66 g (180 gr) FMJ: 2,960 ft/s

Comparisons

 The WSM has slightly more case capacity and thus, slightly more velocity
 The WSM is more popular and more ammo and handloading data are available

See also
 .300 Remington Ultra Magnum
 7 mm caliber
 List of firearms
 List of rifle cartridges
 Table of handgun and rifle cartridges
 List of individual weapons of the U.S. Armed Forces

References

 7mm-300 SAUM Cartridge Guide by AccurateShooter.com

Pistol and rifle cartridges
Remington Short Action Ultra Magnum rifle cartridges